List of the coats of arms of used in Oryol Oblast, Russian Federation.

As of 1 January 2013, there were 267 municipalities in Oryol Oblast - 3 urban districts, 24 municipal districts, 17 city and 223 rural settlements.

Coat of arms of Oryol Oblast

Coats of arms of cities

Coats of arms of municipal districts

References 

Armorials by country subdivision
 Oryol
Oryol Oblast